Janak Harilal Dave (b. 14 June 1930) is a Gujarati dramatist, theater actor and drama teacher from Gujarat, India.

Life
Dave was born on 14 June 1930 at Bhavnagar in British India, to his father Harilal, and mother, Chaturabahen. He passed his matriculation in 1955, and worked at a preschool for seven or eight years. In 1957, he joined the music college affiliated with M. S. University, Vadodara, where he studied dramaturgy under Chandravadan Mehta and Jasvant Thaker, earning his bachelors and masters with first class honours.

From 1963 to 1967, he worked as a chair person of drama department at Sangit Natya Bharati, Rajkot. From 1967 to 1971, he served as lecturer at drama department of Panjab University. In 1971, he joined Gujarat College, taught drama, and retired from there in 1988 as a head of department.

Works
Dave is known as a drama teacher, theater actor and playwright. He is a scholar of Bhavai form (a folk theater form popular mostly in western India). He wrote plays, books on drama-teaching, and translated several books into Gujarati.

He wrote Aakhri Kasabno Ughad (1997) and Abhinay Prashikshan (2002), which are based on the system of Konstantin Stanislavski. His Hetulakshi Ekankio (2001) contains some original plays while some are translated plays. His Bhavai-Vesha (literally different narratives composed in the form of Bhavai) are published as Lokranjan Bhavai (1988), Dehno Dushman and Veshavansh (1998). They are mostly reform-oriented in nature.

Dave has also played a significant role in the development of children theater in Gujarati, and has published several books in the field: Rangalo Chalyo Farva (1989), Natak Khele Bal Gopala (1997) and Balnatya Digdarshan Kala (1997). He was popularly known as 'Janak Dada' among children.

He received the Gaurav Puraskar from the Government of Gujarat in 1993 for his contribution in drama teaching.

See also
 List of Gujarati-language writers

References

External links
 

1930 births
Living people
Maharaja Sayajirao University of Baroda alumni
Indian dramatists and playwrights
Indian male stage actors
Indian drama teachers
Indian male dramatists and playwrights
People from Bhavnagar
Gujarati-language writers
Dramatists and playwrights from Gujarat
Gujarati theatre